Oro Rojo (also known as Red Gold) is a 1978 pirate film that was written and directed by Alberto Vázquez-Figueroa. It was filmed on location in Spain and Mexico.

Plot
A boatswain finds himself stranded on an island.  Surrounded by starving, poor islanders, the boatswain soon learns that the misery is not caused by the people themselves, but rather by a pack of blood-thirsty pirates.

Cast
José Sacristán as Beni
Isela Vega as María
Hugo Stiglitz as Víctor
Patricia Adriani as Aurelia
 as Lucas de Almeyda

Awards
José Sacristán won the Sant Jordi Award for Best Spanish Actor (Mejor Actor Español) in 1979.

References

External links
 

1978 films
Mexican adventure drama films
1970s Spanish-language films
1970s Mexican films
1970s adventure drama films